Soho is an area that is in Central Birmingham and Smethwick, approximately 2 miles north west of Birmingham city centre on the A41.  The name is an abbreviation of South House, denoting that it was located to the south of Handsworth. The section of the A41 separating Handsworth from Winson Green is known as Soho Road.

Soho expanded dramatically during the 19th century with the construction of numerous houses and factories, and immigration from the Commonwealth was centred in these homes during the 1950s and 1960s. Most of the immigrants who settled in Soho were of Indian origin.

Further housebuilding took place by the local council during the 1960s and 1970s.

Soho falls partly in the Soho ward of the City of Birmingham and partly in the Soho and Victoria ward of the Borough of Sandwell.

Soho ward, Birmingham 
Until 1911 the part now within Birmingham  formed part of Handsworth District, and is now a ward within the council constituency of Ladywood.

Demography
The 2001 Population Census found that 25,634 people were living in Soho with a population density of 5,369 people per km2 compared with 3,649 people per km2 for Birmingham. Soho covers an area of 4.8 km2. The ward is a very ethnically diverse area with ethnic minorities making up 76.2% (19,522) of the ward's population, compared with 29.6% for Birmingham.

Ethnicity Population 
White British – 20.48%
White Irish – 2.20%
White Other – 1.17%
Mixed: White and Black Caribbean – 2.80%
Mixed: White and Black African  – 0.22%
Mixed: White and Asian  – 0.81%
Mixed: Other – 0.95%
Indian – 26.77%
Pakistani – 13.99%
Bangladeshi – 3.88%
Other Asian – 2.31%
Afro-Caribbean – 18.13%
African – 1.44%
Other Black – 2.42%
Chinese – 0.69%

Politics
Soho Ward is represented by three Labour councillors on Birmingham City Council; Sybil Spence, Chaman Lal and Dorothy Hargreaves.

Soho Ward has adopted a Ward Support Officer with the current holder of the title being Tariq M. Khan.

In 2014, James Turner Street, in the Winson Green area of the ward featured in the TV series Benefits Street.

Places of interest 
Industrialist Matthew Boulton opened his "Soho Manufactory" (an early factory) there in 1761. Boulton himself resided at Soho House, now a community museum of the Birmingham Museums & Art Gallery run by Birmingham City Council.

The parish church is dedicated to St John Chrysostom. The area is served by Handsworth Library.

Winson Green Prison and City Hospital are located within the Winson Green area of the ward.

Soho is home to a Train Care Depot and the Soho Foundry, which was Matthew Boulton and James Watt’s famous factory.  Most of the rest of the area is industrial with some housing.

Transport
Soho had stations on the London & North Western Railway built Stour Valley Line between Smethwick Rolfe Street and the closed Winson Green railway station, and on the Great Western Railway between Handsworth & Smethwick and Hockley (replaced by Jewellery Quarter). It is currently served by the West Midlands Metro on the former GWR line with a stop at Soho Benson Road.

References

External links
Birmingham City Council Soho Ward
Sandwell Trends, Soho and Victoria Ward

Areas of Birmingham, West Midlands
Former wards of Birmingham, West Midlands
Smethwick
Conservation areas in England